This is the list of present leaders of Malaysian states and federal territories.

Notes

External links
Malaysian states on rulers.org

Government of Malaysia